Sun Jun may refer to:

Sun Jun (Three Kingdoms) (219–256), regent for the emperor Sun Liang of Eastern Wu during the Three Kingdoms period
Sun Jun (basketball) (born 1969), Chinese basketball player
Sun Jun (badminton) (born 1975), Chinese badminton player
Sun Jun (rower) (born 1975), Chinese rower
Sun Jun (footballer) (born 1993), Chinese footballer